The Koshi Barrage is a sluice across the Koshi river that carries vehicular, bicycle, and pedestrian traffic between Saptari district and Sunsari district of Nepal. It is near the International border with India. It was built between 1958 and 1962 and has 56 gates. It was constructed after the Koshi Agreement was signed between the Government of Nepal and India on April 25, 1954. The barrage was designed and built by Joseph and Company Limited, India. The Koshi Tappu Wildlife Reserve is roughly 3–4 miles north of the barrage.

2017 flood 
Due to this barrage, every year several areas of Terai are affected due to the flood and blockage of this barrage. This affects mostly the Koshi region of Bihar (Supaul, Saharsa, Madhepura and Purnia).

2008 flood 

In August 2008, the eastern embankments of the Koshi Barrage collapsed, several miles north of the Nepal-India border. The resulting flood wiped out miles of fertile farmland in Nepal, covering it with a thick layer of river sand, and affected 53,800 Nepalese. It left 3 million people homeless in Bihar, India.

Tourism 

This river the home for Gangetic Dolphin and other different species of fresh water fishes. Siberian birds can be seen there easily during the month of August–October. People usually visit there to have the varieties of fish dishes in the nearby riverside restaurants and see the scenic view from the barrage. The sunrise and the sunset view literally catch people' eyes there. Rowing or a motor boat is available there for extra adventure which carries people to the islets.

Air Transport

Shree Airlines and Buddha Air operates daily flights between Rajbiraj and Kathmandu

See also 
 Kosi embankment

References

External links 

 Sushil Koirala (21 August 2008). "What is Flooding the Koshi Barrage?", eKantipur.com.
 Diversity of Wetland Birds around the Koshi Barrage Area  by D. T. Chhetry in Our Nature (2006)4:91-95 
 

Dams completed in 1962
Dam failures in Asia
Dams in Nepal
Tidal barrages
Flood control in Asia
Water in Nepal
Buildings and structures in Saptari District